Liam Rua Mac Coitir (1675/90?–1738) was an Irish poet.

A Jacobite poet, Mac Coitir was the president of Daimh-scola na mBlarnan, at Blarney.

See also

 Cotter family
 Diarmuid mac Sheáin Bhuí Mac Cárthaigh
 Dónall na Buile Mac Cárthaigh, fl. 1730s–40s.
 Eoghan an Mhéirín Mac Cárthaigh, 1691–1756.

References
 Ireland And The Jacobite Cause, 1685–1766: A Fatal Attachment, p. 193, 228, 260, 276, 306, Éamonn Ó Ciardha, Four Courts Press, 2001, 2004.

Irish poets
Irish Jacobites
Irish-language poets
People from County Cork
17th-century Irish people
18th-century Irish people
Liam